Felix Weber (born December 1, 1960 in Hassfurt, Bavaria) is a German composer, songwriter and record producer.

Early life
At the age of six Weber began a professional training as a classical pianist. At 14 he played in his first garage band and when 17 he toured with American cover bands through the US Army clubs in Bavaria performing for soldiers stationed in Germany. During this time he met his longtime songwriting partner Irmgard Klarmann, who he produced his first record with in 1978 at the Galgenberg Studio in Stuttgart, Germany.

Early songwriting in Germany
Over the next years Weber worked in different German recording studios but mostly at the Rainbow and Paradise Studios in Munich. During his work in Munich he met drummer/producer Todd Canedy whose production skills inspired and motivated Weber to build and eventually work in his own recording studio where he and his partner Klarmann penned many songs under the name Klarmann/Weber. In 1981, Weber became keyboard player of the popular German band "Relax". During this time he made contacts in the record industry, which resulted in song releases for popular German artists such as Mandy Winter, Bernie Paul, Gry Johansen (aka Bo Anderson), Veronika Fischer, Guillermo Marchena, Kristina Bach and others. In 1987 after six years of working with Relax, he left the band to focus on his career as an international composer and producer. Shortly after he was signed to Sony Music and after his two-year contract expired he signed a publishing deal with Warner/Chappell Music Germany where he stayed for 15 years.

International songwriting
Weber who was attracted to American music since his teenage years began to compose exclusively for the American music market, which brought him his first Billboard Top 40 hit in 1988 with singer Tracie Spencer ("Symptoms of True Love"). In 1989 Paul Anka recorded Weber's song "Turning My Mind Back to You" on his Somebody Loves You album, produced by Humberto Gatica. In 1990 Toni Braxton together with her sisters ("The Braxtons") released Weber's song "Good Life". In 1992 Weber had his first #1 hit in the US with singer Chaka Khan ("Love you all my lifetime").  Khan's album "The Woman I Am" received a Grammy award for best vocal performance and Weber's song was awarded the ASCAP award. Billboard called Weber and his partner the "most successful German songwriters." Also in 1992 Randy Crawford released Weber's song "A Lot That You Can Do" which reached #74 in the Billboard R&B charts. Over the next years more songs were recorded by artists such as La Toya Jackson ("Bad Girl"), Leo Sayer, La Bouche (Weber's song "I'll be there" was released on the double platinum album "Sweet Dreams" in 1996, which sold over 8 million copies worldwide), Beverley Knight (The B-Funk), Jennifer Rush (album: Wings of Desire, song: "For all that" produced by Phil Ramone), Christian artist Kathy Troccoli (album: Kathy Troccoli), song: "I'll be there for you", Canadian singer/songwriter Sheree Jeacocke (album: Sheree, song: "Forever you, forever me"), Lory Bianco (album: "Lonely is the night", song: "Heartbreaker" produced by Jeff Lorber), Japanese music idol Seiko Matsuda (album: Seiko, song: "He's so good to me"), Exposé, Nancy Wilson; a collaboration with his late mentor Skip Scarborough (Earth, Wind & Fire, Anita Baker), Penny Ford (a co-production with American Idol judge Randy Jackson), saxophonist Boney James and Australian singer Vanessa Amorosi.

Weber moved to the USA in 2000 where he started a music production company.

References

External links

Felix Weber at Allmusic
Official website
Official Facebook Page

1960 births
Living people
People from Haßfurt
German songwriters